Hodětín is a municipality and village in Tábor District in the South Bohemian Region of the Czech Republic. It has about 100 inhabitants.

Administrative parts
Villages of Blatec and Nová Ves are administrative parts of Hodětín.

References

Villages in Tábor District